The Beach Soccer World Championships was the premier international beach soccer competition contested by men's national teams between 1995 and 2004. It was replaced by the FIFA Beach Soccer World Cup.

The tournament took place annually in Brazil under the supervision of Beach Soccer Worldwide (BSWW) and its predecessors, crowning the world champions of the sport. Due to the sport's rapid growth, FIFA took an interest in it, and as the main tournament in world beach soccer, it joined hands with BSWW in 2005 to take over the organization of the competition, re-branding it as an official FIFA tournament.

Brazil were the most successful team, winning nine of the ten tournaments.

History
The first Beach Soccer World Championship was held in Brazil, in 1995, organised by the precursors to the modern-day founders of the standardised rules, Beach Soccer Worldwide, held under the title Beach Soccer World Championship. Eight teams were selected to take part, without going through a qualification process. However Brazil, the hosts, dominated and easily won the cup without losing a game. The tournament was successful and BSWW announced that the competition would take place every year.

By 1997, more teams had already stated their interest in participating and therefore BSWW extended their selection to 10 teams for 1998. Brazil continued to dominate, despite this change. Immediately, BSWW extended to 12 teams for 1999, spreading their selection across five continents, introducing more new teams to the tournament.
However, with all these changes it still took until the 2001 World Cup for Brazil to lose the title after winning the competition six years on the run since the establishment. It was Portugal who won the tournament, with Brazil finishing in a disappointing fourth place.

With this change of champions, more countries thought there was a chance for themselves to win the tournament and this sparked more interest worldwide. Not surprisingly, Brazil reclaimed their title in 2002, when BSWW reduced the number of contestants back to eight.
The last Beach Soccer World Championship to be organised purely by BSWW was in 2004 when twelve teams played, before being replaced by the FIFA Beach Soccer World Cup the next year.

Results

Teams reaching the top four
Overall, half of the 24 nations who ever competed made a top four finish; only two won the title. Brazil were by far the most successful nation, winning nine titles of the possible ten. Portugal claimed the only crown Brazil did not win. 

Brazil were also the only nation to finish in the final four of every championship.

Note: Brazil hosted all tournaments.

By confederation

Tournament appearances 

24 countries participated over the ten competitions, however nearly half (11) only appeared at one edition. Three participated in all World Championships: Brazil, Italy and Uruguay. European teams dominated in unique appearances by continent, since half of all countries were from Europe. Oceania were the only region never to be represented at least once.

Only eight of the 24 countries have failed to reappear at a FIFA controlled World Cup. Peru (5) appeared in the most competitions without yet participating in a FIFA World Cup.

Overall team records
In this ranking 3 points are awarded for a win in normal time, 2 points for a win in extra time or penalty shoot-out and 0 for a loss. Teams are ranked by total points, then by goal difference, then by goals scored. Only the points for the first 10 World Championships that occurred between 1995 and 2004 are counted here.

Awards
The following documents the winners of the awards presented at the conclusion of the tournament. Three awards were consistently bestowed at each event.

Top goalscorers

From the data available, the below table shows the top 20 goalscorers of the World Championships.

Attendance figures
Note that attendance records are not available between 1995 and 2002.

References

External links
History, FIFA.com 
The Beach Soccer Championships,  BeachsoccerUSA.org 
RSSSF.com Beach Soccer Championships, RSSSF.com 

 
World Championships
Beach soccer
Recurring sporting events established in 1995
Recurring sporting events disestablished in 2004